Noman Bashir (Urdu: نعمان بشير)  was a Pakistan Navy admiral who served as the 18th Chief of Naval Staff (CNS) from 7 October 2008 until retiring on 7 October 2011.

His appointment as Chief of Naval Staff was approved by President Asif Ali Zardari on the recommendation of Defence Minister Ahmad Mukhtar on 5 October 2008, ultimately superseding the senior most, Vice-Admiral Asaf Humayun, to the four-star promotion.

In 2011, Adm. Bashir was notably superseded and overlooked for the appointment of Chairman joint chiefs when the junior-most officer, Lt-Gen. K. Shameem Wynne, was eventually selected despite coming short of his qualifications.

Admiral Bashir came under widespread criticism for failing to stop the siege of the Pakistan Naval air station PNS Mehran in time, which lead to the deaths of sailors, officers, destruction of Naval aircraft and damage to the base.

Biography

Early life and education

After attending and securing his matriculation from the Army Burn Hall College in Abottabad, Bashir was accepted to attend the Pakistan Naval Academy in 1971.

He passed out in 1973, and gained commissioned as S-Lt. in the Naval Operations Branch. He was further trained at the Air Force Academy as a naval aviator, and joined the Naval Aviation as a combat helicopter pilot in 1975, and later qualified to fly the P3C Orion and various other aircraft in 1990s.

His brother, Salman Bashir, is a diplomat and former Foreign Secretary at the Ministry of Foreign Affairs.

After his combat pilot's training, Bashir was directed to attend the National Defence University in Islamabad where he studied at the Armed Forces War College (afwc). He graduated with MSc in War studies and briefly tenured the professorship at the Armed Forces War College (afwc) where he taught courses on topics involving the Strategic studies. He was later sent to the United Kingdom to attend the Royal College of Defence Studies (RCDS) where he focused towards the geo-strategic studies, eventually graduating with master's degree.

At RCDS, his master's thesis, "Afghanistan and the 'New Great Game" was shortlisted in the Seaford House Papers 2000. In it, he defended his claims that the "[A]fghan Taliban are inward rather than outward looking" and "they have also signalled readiness to engage constructively with the international community."

Moreover, he argued that "keeping Afghanistan broken and destabilized suits those who do not want the Caspian/Central Asian oil and gas pipelines to take one of the shortest and economical outlets over Afghanistan and Pakistan to the Arabian Sea."

Career in the military

War and staff appointments in the Pakistan Navy
In 1971, Bashir served in the western front of the third war with India as a naval aviator, flying the army aviation's H-13 boarded on a warship, before joining the Pakistan Naval Academy in Karachi. A career naval aviator, Bashir commanded the two navy's combat aviation squadron before commanding the two warships: a Tariq-class frigate and a corvette. In 1995, Captain Bashir commanded the PNS Tariq, paying a visit to Singapore where he was joined by the RSS Valiant for bilateral exercise.

In 1999, Capt. Bashir was appointed to direct the inquiry board to investigate the probable cause of the Atlantique shootdown by the Indian Air Force, and later investigating the accident involving the P-3C Orion in 1999.

In 2000s, Cdre. Bashir briefly served as the Cdre-in-Charge of the Jinnah Naval Base in Balochistan, and later serving as the Commodore Training Ashore under the Flag Officer Sea Training (FOST) in Karachi. In 2003, Cdre. Bashir took over the command of the Naval Air Arm as Commander Naval Aviation (COMNAV), eventually promoted to the star-rank rank admiral in the Navy.

In 2004, R-Adm. Bashir was appointed as the Director-General of the Naval Intelligence (DGNI) which he directed the military intelligence until he was appointed as Commander of the Pakistan Armed Forces–Middle East in Oman in 2005.

Upon returning from deputation in 2006, R-Adm. Bashir was taken as secondment and directed as general manager at the Karachi Port Trust, and later posted as the DCNS (Projects-II) at the Navy NHQ in Islamabad until 2007.

On 19 July 2007, R-Adm. Bashir was elevated to the three-star rank in the Navy while serving in the Navy NHQ as DCNS (Projects-II). On 22 July 2007, Vice-Admiral Bashir became a senior fleet commander when he took over the command as the Commander Pakistan Fleet, and left the command on when he handed over the command to then-R-Adm. Shahid Iqbal on 20 June 2008.

On 20 June 2008, V-Adm. Bashir was appointed to command the Karachi coast as its Commander Karachi (COMKAR), which is responsible for entire naval combat units in Sindh and Balochistan.

Chief of Naval Staff

Upon the retirement of Adm. Afzal Tahir being confirmed, Vice-Adm. Noman Bashir was in the race of the promotion to four-star rank 
alongside with four senior navy admirals included with seniority:
V-Adm. Asaf Humayun, senior fleet commander of Pakistan Fleet based in Karachi.
V-Adm. Noman Bashir, Commander of Karachi coast based in Karachi. 
V-Adm. Saleem Minai, DCNS (Personnel) in Navy NHQ in Islamabad. 
V-Adm. M. A. Khan, DCNS (Operations) in Navy NHQ in Islamabad.

On 5 October 2008, President Asif Zardari eventually promoted V-Adm. Bashir as the four-star admiral in the Navy and appointed Adm. Noman as Chief of Naval Staff (CNS), superseding the senior most V-Adm. Asaf Humayun who was moved to be appointed as Vice Chief of Naval Staff (VCNS).

It was reported that then-Defence Minister Ahmed Mukhtar had recommended Adm. Noman's name over V-Adm. Humayun to be elevated at the four-star rank. Eventually, V-Adm. Humayun was appointed as vice naval chief on 31 October 2008.

After assuming the command, Admiral Bashir thanked the president for the appointment and recognized the role of Navy facing the multiple challenges in the realm of maritime security due to the presence of various powers in Pakistan's area of interest.

Talking to the media, Bashir vowed that Navy to rise to the occasion to safeguard the national interests at any cost.

Indo-Pakistani standoff in 2008

Only a month of assuming his role as Chief of Naval Staff, Adm. Bashir faced the major crises with neighboring India after the deadly attacks were perpetuated in Mumbai in November 2008. Adm. Bashir high-alerted the Navy and deployed the combatant commands of the Navy to protect the naval vicinity of Sindh and Balochistan. Initially, Adm. Bashir denied that the terrorists who attacked the city had not used the sea routes from Pakistan to reach the city. In a pressing briefing at the ISPR, Adm. Bashir maintained that: "We have no evidence whatsoever that [Ajmal Kasab]  had gone to India from Pakistani waters. The Indian Navy is much larger than ours, and if Ajmal Kasab had gone from here, then what were their Coast Guards doing, and why did they did not stop the terrorists?."<ref name="Kashmir webnews">{{cite news|last=Staff|title=Mumbai attack: Antony, Navy chief strongly rebut Pakistan''s about turn|url=http://www.kashmirnow.com/kashmir_news/National/10917-Mumbai-attack-Antony-Navy-chief-strongly-rebut-Pakistans-about-turn.html|accessdate=11 March 2013|newspaper=Kashmir webnews|date=28 February 2009}}</ref>

His statement was widely criticized by Indian government and Indian Defence Minister A. K. Antony strongly rebutted his statement.

However, after a day of releasing his statement, Adm. Bashir retraced his statement and reiterated that "whatever evidence [Indians] have is correct." Adm. Bashir strongly criticized Indian army chief General Deepak Kapoor's statement about simultaneous war with China and Pakistan. Talking to the AAJ TV, Admiral Bashir quoted that :"Indian generals are well aware of our strength." He maintained to the television correspondents that he does not take Indian army chief General Deepak Kapoor's statement seriously as he "knows about the strength of his neighboring countries, Pakistan and China."

In 2008, in an interview to a Daily Pakistan'', the Admiral Noman Bashir, had told his interviewer that "Pakistan was quite capable of building a nuclear submarine and would do so "if required". Pakistan is a "recognized nuclear power" and if the government made a decision, the nation would develop a naval variant nuclear weapon.

During this time, he began pushed and lobbied for building the nuclear submarine and finally, in February 2012, the government gave green signals and authorised the development of the nation's first nuclear submarine after releasing the funds. In 2010, Bashir noted that "the Indian Navy wants to increase military might in the region."

PNS Mehran attack

Admiral Noman Bashir was the chief of naval staff when Al Qaeda attacked PNS Mehran, a Pakistan Naval Air Station in retaliation for the killing of Osama Bin Ladin. Despite being Naval chief at the breach of the insurgency in the country his command failed to intercept the threat of an attack on a sensitive installation of the Pakistan Naval Air Arm, the failure of which lead to a day long siege of the base in the middle of Pakistan's largest city, Karachi.

He commanded and coordinated the navy-army operations in north-western contingent of the country and expanded the role of navy on wide range of its operational capacity. Major deployments of navy was made under Admiral Bashir in all over the country to curbed the terrorism. Admiral Bashir earned public notability and public appraise after successfully executing the cross-border operation to evacuated the Pakistani nationals from Somalia. This cross border operation was conducted by Navy alone; and Admiral Bashir personally supervised the execution of the operation.

Admiral Bashir was widely criticized by media for not properly protecting the naval base from being attacked by group of terrorists. However, Admiral Bashir rejected the accusations of security breach on media. On 20 June 2011, Bashir submitted the report over the course of action to the Prime minister and briefed the Prime minister about the security arrangements which had been put in place following the attack on the naval base. During the last days of his terms, Bashir supervised and personally gave commissioned of navy's first UAV squadron in Karachi.

Retirement

Upon his retirement in 2011, Admiral Bashir was considered to be on the "short list" of choices for Chairman of the Joint Chiefs of Staff Committee included with seniority:

Adm. Noman Bashir, Chief of Naval Staff headquartered Navy NHQ in Islamabad. 
Gen. Ashfaq Parvez Kayani, Chief of Army Staff headquartered in Army GHQ in Rawalpindi. 
Lt-Gen. K. Shameem Wynne, the Chief of General Staff headquartered in Army GHQ in Rawalpindi.

The eventual pick was the most-junior Army's general, Lt-Gen. Khalid Shameem Wynne, for the Chairman joint chiefs appointment.

Earlier, the Pakistan government had sent the proposal to appoint General Ashfaq Parvez Kayani as the additional office of the Chairman Joint Chiefs of Staff Committee, but instead Kayani received the extension. However, the Pakistani media then reported since Admiral Bashir is the most senior officer, Admiral Bashir would likely to become the Chairman of the Joint Chiefs of Staff Committee.

In the line of promotion, General Khalid Shameem Wynne was the most-general in the Pakistan Army, as his chances to become Chief of Army Staff was diminished. On the advice of General Kayani, General Khalid Shameem Wynne was promoted to four-star rank and assumed the Chairmanship of Joint Chiefs of Staff Committee.

Awards and decorations

See also
Pakistan Navy
Pakistan Naval Aviation
Mirage 5 in the services of Pakistan Navy
P3C Orion in Pakistan Navy

Notes

External links

 

Date of birth missing (living people)
People from Abbottabad
Army Burn Hall College alumni
Pakistani military personnel of the Indo-Pakistani War of 1971
Pilots of the Indo-Pakistani War of 1971
Pakistan Naval Academy alumni
National Defence University, Pakistan alumni
Naval aviators
Pakistani test pilots
Graduates of the Royal College of Defence Studies
Pakistani expatriates in Oman
Pakistan Navy admirals
Chiefs of Naval Staff (Pakistan)
People of the insurgency in Khyber Pakhtunkhwa
Foreign recipients of the Legion of Merit
Recipients of Nishan-e-Imtiaz
Recipients of Hilal-i-Imtiaz
Recipients of Sitara-i-Imtiaz
Recipients of Tamgha-e-Imtiaz
Living people
Year of birth missing (living people)